Cheechoo is a Cree language surname. People with this surname include:

Colin Cheechoo, former guitarist with the band Breach of Trust
Jonathan Cheechoo, hockey player
Lloyd Cheechoo, musician featured on the compilation album Native North America, Vol. 1
Shirley Cheechoo, actress, artist and filmmaker
Vern Cheechoo, musician

Native American surnames